Sorry You Couldn't Make It is a studio album by American musician and producer Swamp Dogg. It was released on March 6, 2020 via Joyful Noise Recordings in partnership with Pioneer Works Press. Recording sessions took place at Sound Emporium in Nashville. It features contributions from John Prine, Justin Vernon, Jenny Lewis, and Ryan Olson among others. The duet sung between Swamp Dogg and John Prine appearing at the end of the album ("Please Let Me Go Round Again") is one of John Prine's final in-studio recording sessions. Swamp Dogg had known Prine since 1972, when he covered the country singer's ballad "Sam Stone" on his album third LP Cuffed, Collared & Tagged.

Critical reception

Sorry You Couldn't Make It was met with generally favorable reviews from critics. At Metacritic, which assigns a weighted average rating out of 100 to reviews from mainstream publications, this release received an average score of 79, based on eight reviews. The aggregator Album of the Year has the critical consensus of the album at a 77 out of 100, based on eleven reviews.

Steven Edelstone of Paste praised the album saying "Sorry You Couldn't Make It represents yet another late-career experiment in a lengthy one filled with them, a back-to-basics approach by an artist who's seen it all. There’s no telling where Swamp Dogg goes from here, but if his most recent handful of releases are anything to go off of, it'll likely sound nothing like Sorry You Couldn't Make It. But it also means that no matter what genre he tries on next, the results will be astounding". Scott Zuppardo of PopMatters stated "Sure, he loves his horns, we all do, but his country roots are showing on this record, and it's glorious". John Lewis of Uncut said "The lyrics are presented with such conviction that it becomes quietly devastating. Rather like Swamp Dogg himself". Allison Hussey of Pitchfork said "His new album Sorry You Couldn't Make It restores him to a more even keel, examining grief from greater distance while savoring life's little sweetnesses. Billed as Williams' country album, Sorry You Couldn't Make It hits its thematic marks within funkified arrangements". AllMusic's Mark Deming said "Sorry You Couldn't Make It declares there should be a place for Swamp Dogg in the country pantheon alongside Charley Pride, Stoney Edwards, Darius Rucker, and the other brave artists who've confronted the color line in Nashville". Kaelen Bell of Exclaim! said "Though it still flirts with the blues, soul and R&B that he's built his name on, the record has a country-fried warmth, coloured by slide guitar and Southern rhythms. That those Southern rhythms are played mostly by chintzy drum machine, that they're undermined by hip-hop-biting guitar samples or artificial horns, is the record's vaguely outlandish appeal". Music critic Tom Hull said "Jerry Williams, started out as an Atlantic r&b producer, released a brilliant debut as Swamp Dogg in 1970, and has been fading in and out ever since, his best moments the ones farthest out. Plays it safe here with a round of soulful blues, but lured John Prine in to cameo on two nostalgic ones, which are daring enough".

Track listing

Personnel
Jerry "Swamp Dogg" Williams Jr. – vocals
Vocalists

Channy Leaneagh – vocals (tracks: 1, 7)
Jenny Lewis – vocals (tracks: 1, 7)
Mina Moore – vocals (tracks: 1, 7)
Justin Vernon – vocals (tracks: 2, 4), piano (track 1), guitar (tracks: 2-10)
Carmen Marks – vocals (track 3)
Courtland Williams – vocals (track 3)
Harry Watkins – vocals (track 3)
Leona Leshon – vocals (track 3)
Sherron Crenshaw – vocals (track 3)
Taj' London – vocals (track 3)
John Prine – vocals (tracks: 6, 10)

Instrumentalists

Jim Oblon – guitar (tracks: 1, 4)
Chris Bierden – bass (tracks: 1–7, 9, 10)
Larry "MoogStar" Clemon – synth (tracks: 1–3, 5–9), congas (track 6)
Carmen J. Camerieri – horns (tracks: 2, 3, 9)
Derrick Lee – Hammond B-3 (tracks: 1, 3, 10), Rhodes piano (tracks: 1, 2, 4, 5, 7, 10), piano (tracks: 3, 5–9), chorus arrangement (track 3)
Jacob Hanson – guitar (track 3)
Alistair Sung – cello (tracks: 3–5, 7)
Sam Amidon – fiddle (track 4)

Technicals

Ryan Olson – producer
Mark Nevers – engineering, mixing
Zack Pancoast – assistant engineering
Robert Weston – mastering
David McMurry – photography
Daniel Kent – design, layout
Ryan Hover – design, layout

References

External links
 Sorry You Couldn't Make It at Bandcamp
 

2020 albums
Swamp Dogg albums
Joyful Noise Recordings albums